RWI may refer to:

 Rusty Wallace, Inc, former name of Rusty Wallace Racing, a US NASCAR racing team
 Rheinisch-Westfälisches Institut für Wirtschaftsforschung, a German economics research institute in Essen
 IATA code of Rocky Mount–Wilson Regional Airport
 A universe created by Captain Jack, A youtuber who has name this universe-Red wood Industries- or RWI. The universe is centered around the game Space Engineers.